Helen Chandler (February 1, 1906  –  April 30, 1965) was an American film and theater actress, best known for playing Mina Seward in the 1931 horror film Dracula.

Career

Born in Charleston, South Carolina, Chandler began her acting career in New York City at the age of eight and was on Broadway two years later in 1917.  Her early performances include  Arthur Hopkins' 1920 production of Richard III, which starred John Barrymore, Macbeth in 1921 with Lionel Barrymore; Hedvig in Henrik Ibsen's The Wild Duck in 1925 and Ophelia in the 1925 modern dress version of Hamlet starring Basil Sydney. By the time of her first film she had been in over twenty Broadway productions.
She made her film debut in 1927 in the silent film The Music Master and in 1930 joined Leslie Howard, Douglas Fairbanks Jr., and Beryl Mercer for Outward Bound, the film version of the stage success. The unusual story told of a group of passengers on an ocean liner who gradually realize that they are all dead and will soon face the Last Judgment. Chandler, with her blonde hair and ethereal quality, was considered to be perfectly cast, and she received critical praise for her performance.

Chandler did not want to play the role for which she is probably best remembered, Mina in Dracula (1931); she wanted to play Alice in Alice in Wonderland. Nevertheless, Chandler joined David Manners and Bela Lugosi in what became one of the most successful movies made at that time.  Chandler appeared with Manners that same year in the Lost Generation celebration of alcohol in Paris, The Last Flight, also starring Richard Barthelmess and John Mack Brown. She achieved more successes in A House Divided (1931) and Christopher Strong (1933), all the while dividing her time among films, radio work, and theater roles in Los Angeles, New York and London.

She starred in British actor Will Hay's 1934 movie, Radio Parade of 1935 and played a role on Lux Radio in Alibi Ike with Joe E. Brown (1937). Among her later stage successes were Within The Gates in 1934, Pride and Prejudice in 1935, Lady Precious Stream in 1936 with then-husband Bramwell Fletcher, a reprise of her film role in Outward Bound in 1938 and various productions of Boy Meets Girl and Noël Coward's Tonight at 8.30

Personal life
On February 14, 1935, Chandler married actor Bramwell Fletcher in Riverside Church in New York. She had previously been married to Cyril Hume, whom she divorced in 1934.

By the late 1930s she was battling alcoholism and her acting career declined. She was hospitalized several times but was unable to gain control over her life. In 1950, Chandler was severely burned in an apartment fire, caused by her falling asleep while smoking. She survived but her body was badly disfigured. Her alcoholism continued unabated after the accident.

Death
Helen Chandler died on April 30, 1965, from cardiac arrest during surgery for a stomach ulcer in Hollywood, California. Her remains were cremated in accordance with her wishes, and are interred at Chapel of the Pines Crematory in Los Angeles.

Filmography

The Music Master (1927) as Jenny
The Joy Girl (1927) as Flora
Mother's Boy (1929) as Rose Lyndon
Salute (1929) as Nancy Wayne
The Sky Hawk (1929) as Joan Allan
Rough Romance (1930) as Marna Reynolds
Outward Bound (1930) as Ann
Mothers Cry (1930) as Beattie Williams
Dracula (1931) as Mina Seward
Daybreak  (1931) as Laura Taub
Salvation Nell (1931) as Nell Saunders
The Last Flight (1931) as Nikki
Fanny Foley Herself (1931) as Lenore
A House Divided (1931) as Ruth Evans
Vanity Street (1932) as Jeanie Gregg
Behind Jury Doors (1932) as Elsa Lanfield
Christopher Strong (1933) as Monica Strong
Alimony Madness (1933) as Joan Armstrong
Dance Hall Hostess (1933) as Nora Marsh
Goodbye Again (1933) as Elizabeth Clochessy
The Worst Woman in Paris? (1933) as Mary Dunbar
Long Lost Father (1934) as Lindsey Lane
Midnight Alibi (1934) as Abigail 'Abbie' Ardsley as a Girl
Unfinished Symphony (1934) as Emmie Passeuter
Radio Parade of 1935 (1934) as Joan Garland
It's a Bet (1935) as Clare
Mr. Boggs Steps Out (1938) as Oleander Tubbs (final film role)

Notes

References

External links

 
 
 
 Helen Chandler Fansite
 Van Neste, Dan. ""Helen Chandler: Vision of Beauty"" Films of the Golden Age, Spring, 1998 .
 Fiore, David. Hypocritic Days Insomniac Press, 2014. Toronto Star review of the novel

1906 births
1965 deaths
American film actresses
American silent film actresses
American stage actresses
Burials at Chapel of the Pines Crematory
Actresses from Charleston, South Carolina
20th-century American actresses